Abelardo Menéndez Orue (5 September 1928 – 22 May 1995) was a Cuban fencer. He competed at the 1952 and 1960 Summer Olympics.

Notes

References

1928 births
1995 deaths
Cuban male fencers
Olympic fencers of Cuba
Fencers at the 1952 Summer Olympics
Fencers at the 1960 Summer Olympics
Sportspeople from Havana
Pan American Games medalists in fencing
Pan American Games bronze medalists for Cuba
Fencers at the 1951 Pan American Games
20th-century Cuban people